Dhananjayan Sivaguru ("Danny") Sriskandarajah (born December 1975) is the Chief Executive of Oxfam GB. Until December 2018, he was the Secretary General of CIVICUS, a global alliance of civil society organisations. Prior to that, Danny was Director General of the Royal Commonwealth Society, a large NGO devoted to Commonwealth affairs based in London, and was the first non-British and youngest person to head this 140-year-old organisation.

Early life and education
Sriskandarajah was born in Sri Lanka, the son of Sri Lankan Tamils. He migrated to Australia at a young age.

Sriskandarajah was educated at James Ruse Agricultural High School in Carlingford, New South Wales, Australia, graduating in 1993. He was the school captain and well mentored by Art Herger.

Sriskandarajah then attended the University of Sydney, from which he graduated with a Bachelor of Economics and Social Science in 1998. During 1995 and 1996, he resided at Wesley College, a residential college within, but separate from, the university.

After becoming the first Asian Australian to win a Rhodes scholarship in 1998,  Sriskandarajah then matriculated to Magdalen College, a constituent college of the University of Oxford, to read for an M.Phil. and then a D.Phil. in international development. His research focused on inequalities and ethnic conflict in Sri Lanka.

Career
Sriskandarajah held various posts from 2004 to 2009 including Deputy Director of the left-leaning think tank, the Institute for Public Policy Research.

He was Director General of the Royal Commonwealth Society, from 2009 to 2012, the youngest ever person and the first non-Briton to head this organisation.

He was the Secretary General of CIVICUS a global alliance of civil society organisations, headquartered in Johannesburg, South Africa, from January 2013 to December 2018. He was the fourth person to hold this position, following Miklos Marschall (Hungary), Kumi Naidoo (South Africa) and Ingrid Srinath (India). In this role Sriskandarajah regularly represented civil society at international fora including the UN General Assembly in New York and the World Economic Forum in Davos, Switzerland.

Danny was appointed the Chief Executive of Oxfam GB in January 2019.

He is a Trustee of Comic Relief.

In July 2018 Sriskandarajah was announced as a member of the UN Secretary General's High Level Panel on  Digital  Cooperation, co-chaired by Jack Ma and Melinda Gates. He was previously a member of the High Level Panel on Humanitarian Finance from 2015 to 2016. In 2012, he was named a Young Global Leader by the World Economic Forum.

He is known as both a researcher and commentator on foreign policy and democracy, including as a guest on the BBC World Service and contributor to the Guardian and Al Jazeera. He has written books and reports on several migration-related topics, including on British emigration.

Sriskandarajah is an outspoken supporter of the Campaign for the Establishment of a United Nations Parliamentary Assembly, an organisation which campaigns for democratic reformation of the United Nations.

Personal life
On 16 August 2003, Sriskandarajah married Trinidadian Barrister Suzanne Julia Lambert in Trinidad, West Indies.

References

External links
Dhananjayan Sriskandarajah on Twitter

Interview with Danny Skiskandarajah

1975 births
Alumni of Magdalen College, Oxford
Australian people of Sri Lankan Tamil descent
Australian Rhodes Scholars
Living people
People educated at James Ruse Agricultural High School
Sri Lankan Hindus
Sri Lankan Tamil activists
University of Sydney alumni